Meriam George (born 30 May 1987 in Cairo, Egypt) is an Egyptian beauty pageant titleholder and first runner-up at Miss Supertalent. At the age of eighteen, she was the official Pantene Miss Egypt 2005 winner. She represented Egypt in Miss Universe 2005, Miss Intercontinental 2005 and Miss Earth 2006. In Miss Earth, she was among the eight finalists, in Miss Intercontinental, she was a semifinalist, and in Miss Universe, she did not place. In October 2013, she traveled to Seoul, South Korea, to represent her country as "Miss Egypt" at the Miss Supertalent of the World 2013, where she placed as first runner-up, Egypt's best showing in the grand slam pageants since Antigone Costanda was Miss World in 1954. She is a Coptic Christian.

References

External links 
 Mariam George is Miss Universe Egypt 2005

1987 births
Egyptian female models
Egyptian people of Coptic descent
Living people
Miss Earth 2006 contestants
Miss Egypt winners
Miss Universe 2005 contestants
Models from Cairo